Uchili  is a village in East Godavari district of the Indian state of Andhra Pradesh. It is located in Atreyapuram mandal of Amalapuram revenue division.

Population

References 

Villages in East Godavari district